The Men's 50m Freestyle event at the 2003 Pan American Games took place on August 16, 2003 (Day 15 of the Games). Fernando Scherer BRA) won his third consecutive Pan Am 50 freestyle title with 22.40, with José Meolans (ARG) second in 22.42 and Gary Hall, Jr. (USA) third with 22.43.

Medalists

Records

Results

Notes

See also
Swimming at the 2004 Summer Olympics – Men's 50 metre freestyle

References
usaswimming
2003 Pan American Games Results: Day 15, CBC online; retrieved 2009-06-13.

Freestyle, 50m